Kwun Tong Government Secondary School (often abbreviated as KTGSS) is a co-educational and E.M.I. (English as Medium of Instruction) school. It was founded in 1982.  It is located at 9 Shun Chi Street, Shun Chi Court, Shun Lee, Kowloon, Hong Kong.

In January 2023, the school said that teachers must vet speeches from guest speakers, and that "Speakers need to submit their speech or presentation slides in advance, and cannot promote political messages or express a political stance."

Student Union 
Past Student Union

See also
 Education in Hong Kong
 List of schools in Hong Kong

References

External links
Kwun Tong Government Secondary School website

Educational institutions established in 1982
Government schools in Hong Kong
Shun Lee
Secondary schools in Hong Kong
1982 establishments in Hong Kong